Calosoma blaptoides is a species of ground beetle in the subfamily of Carabinae. It was described by Jules Putzeys in 1845.

References

Blaptoides
Beetles described in 1845